Zonalia is a genus of parasitic flies in the family Tachinidae. There is one described species in Zonalia, Z. nitens.

Species
Zonalia nitens Curran, 1934

Distribution
Panama

References

Dexiinae
Monotypic Brachycera genera
Insects described in 1934
Taxa named by Charles Howard Curran
Diptera of North America